Malmö FF had a resurgence on the domestic scene in 1994, following a disappointing 1993 campaign that nearly ended in having to seal the stay in the top flight through playout.

Under new coach Rolf Zetterlund, Malmö fought for the league title, with young striker Jörgen Pettersson scoring 14 goals and veteran playmaker Robert Prytz being influential in the relative success.

Squad

The squad list contains players used in 1994 Allsvenskan.

Goalkeepers
  Jonnie Fedel
  Carsten Olausson
  Björn Stringheim

Defenders
  Niclas Nylén
  Torbjörn Persson
  Jonas Wirmola
  Henrik Nilsson
  Tommy Jönsson

Midfielders
  Anders Andersson
  Jörgen Ohlsson
  Robert Prytz
  Jens Fjellström
  Joakim Persson
  Mika Nurmela
  Erol Bekir
  Stefan Alvén

Attackers
  Peter Hillgren
  Jörgen Pettersson
  Fredrik Dahlström

Allsvenskan

Fixtures

Top scorers
  Jörgen Pettersson 14
  Jens Fjellström 9
  Robert Prytz 7
  Peter Hillgren 5
  Fredrik Dahlström 4

Sources
 Årets fotboll 1994 (Swedish)

Malmö FF seasons
Malmo